The 1891 Kentucky gubernatorial election was held on August 3, 1891. Democratic nominee John Y. Brown defeated Republican nominee Andrew T. Wood with 49.85% of the vote.

General election

Candidates
Major party candidates
John Y. Brown, Democratic
Andrew T. Wood, Republican 

Other candidates
S. B. Erwin, People's
Josiah Harris, Prohibition

Results

References

1891
Kentucky
Gubernatorial
August 1891 events